RFA Tideforce is a  replenishment tanker of the British Royal Fleet Auxiliary (RFA). Launched in 2017, the ship entered service with the RFA in 2019.

Construction
Tideforce, along with her three sister ships, was built by DSME in South Korea. As the fourth and final Tide-class vessel, her steel was first cut on 2 December 2015 prior to being laid down on 24 December 2015. Around nine months later, the ship was fully assembled and floated out by 12 September 2016. A series of builder's sea trials subsequently commenced and, in June 2018, the ship left South Korea for delivery to the United Kingdom via San Diego and the Panama Canal. The ship arrived in Falmouth for fitting out on 22 August 2018. This involved the installation of communications equipment, defensive systems, a floating helipad and refueling rigs. Following fitting out, the ship carried out capability assessment trials, replenishment at sea (RAS) trials and first-of-class flying trials. In July 2019, she achieved further milestones, carrying out her first RAS with the aircraft carrier , as well as her first RAS with a foreign vessel,  of the Royal Netherlands Navy.

Operational history

Tideforce entered service with the Royal Fleet Auxiliary on 30 July 2019, the last of her class to do so following sister ships Tidespring, Tiderace and Tidesurge. In September, the ship joined the UK Carrier Strike Group on its three-month Westlant 19 deployment to the United States.

In August 2020, Tideforce rendezvoused with Standing NATO Maritime Group 1 to provide replenishment. In March, whilst conducting aviation training off the Devon and Dorset coast, Tideforce responded to an emergency call from a Dutch-flagged ship and provided assistance to an injured sailor. During the same month, the ship joined eight UK naval ships in responding to seven Russian vessels near British waters.

In October 2022, Tideforce, with Wildcat helicopter embarked, was deployed to the Turks and Caicos islands to provide surveillance support to the Royal Turks and Caicos Islands Police Force which was confronted with rising gang violence in the territory.

References 

 

Tide-class tankers
2017 ships
Ships built by Daewoo Shipbuilding & Marine Engineering